George Warren "Juice" Latham (September 6, 1852 – May 26, 1914), also known as "Jumbo" Latham, was an American Major League Baseball first baseman and manager.  In his career, he played for five different teams in five seasons, while managing two of them.

Career
Latham was born on September 16, 1852, in Utica, New York, and is credited as the first major league player from that city.

In 1877 and 1878, he was the first baseman and manager of the Canadian team, the London Tecumsehs of the International Association of Professional Base Ball Players.

He was still playing baseball as late as  when he was playing first base for a team from Richfield Springs, New York. Latham died at the age of 61 in his hometown of Utica. He was buried at Forest Hill Cemetery in Utica.

See also
List of Major League Baseball player–managers

References

External links

Baseball Almanac player page

1852 births
1914 deaths
19th-century baseball players
Major League Baseball first basemen
Baseball players from New York (state)
Sportspeople from Utica, New York
Boston Red Stockings players
New Haven Elm Citys players
New Haven Elm Citys managers
Louisville Grays players
Philadelphia Athletics (AA) players
Philadelphia Athletics (AA) managers
Louisville Eclipse players
Utica (minor league baseball) players
Springfield (minor league baseball) players
Washington Nationals (minor league) players
Richmond Virginians (minor league) players
Trenton Trentonians players
Utica Pent Ups players
Columbus Buckeyes (minor league) players
Elmira (minor league baseball) players
Oneida Indians players
Major League Baseball player-managers
Burials at Forest Hill Cemetery (Utica, New York)